The Philippines has three metropolitan areas, as defined by the National Economic and Development Authority (NEDA).

Metro Manila is the largest conurbation or urban agglomeration in the country, and its territory comprises the City of Manila, 15 neighboring cities, and the municipality of Pateros. Metro Davao in Mindanao is the Philippines' second most populous urban area and the country's largest by total land area, while Metro Cebu in the Visayas is the third most populous.

The official definition of each area does not necessarily follow the actual extent of continuous urbanization. For example, the built-up area of Metro Manila has long spilled out of its borders into the adjacent provinces of Bulacan, Cavite, Laguna, and Rizal.

The number of metropolitan areas in the Philippines was reduced from 12 in 2007 to the current 3 based from the 2017–2022 Philippine Development Plan by NEDA. The other 10 metropolitan areas were: Metro Angeles, Metro Bacolod, Metro Baguio, Metro Batangas, Metro Cagayan de Oro, Metro Dagupan, Metro Iloilo–Guimaras, Metro Naga, and Metro Olongapo.

List

Gallery

See also
List of cities in the Philippines
List of metropolitan areas in Asia
List of urban agglomerations in Asia

References

External links

Philippines
 
Metropolitan areas
Metropolitan areas